Baby Bottleneck is a 1946 Warner Bros. Looney Tunes cartoon directed by Bob Clampett and written by Warren Foster. The cartoon was released on March 16, 1946, and stars Daffy Duck and Porky Pig. Tweety makes a cameo appearance in the film.

Plot
As the post-World War II baby boom explodes, an overworked stork (patterned after comedian Jimmy Durante) gets drunk in the Stork Club, complaining that he does all the work and the fathers get all the credit. Inexperienced animals—among them a dog with a propeller-powered tail carrying bundles of babies, four crows attempting to deliver an elephant, a pelican with simple devices to help haul the babies in its bill, and a mouse dragging a baby rhino—are among those commissioned to handle the increased workload as they take the babies to their parents. Because of the inexperience of the substitutes, babies are getting sent to the wrong parents; a mother goose is disgusted by her baby skunk, a baby kitten refuses to swim for its mother duck, a baby gorilla rides uncomfortably in the pouch of a kangaroo, a Scottie Dog tries to rock his hippo to sleep, and two parents receive offspring that try to eat them—a kitten to a terrified mouse and an alligator to a pig.

Porky Pig is brought in to manage Storks Inc. and its assembly line, with Daffy Duck as his assistant. While Daffy mans the phones, making quick references to Bing Crosby ("I'm sorry, Bing, you've used up your quota."), Eddie Cantor ("You say you haven't got that boy yet?") and the Dionne Quintuplets' father ("Mr. Dionne, please!"), Porky runs the control room, contacting references to Roydan Stork, Jimmy Doolittle as Jimmy Doo-quite-a-little, and a B-19. Then a dog worker, apparently research and development, comes in through Porky's door and tells him that strapping a skyrocket to the back would speed things exponentially, but the rocket exploded before the send-off. It's back to the drawing board for that idea.

Then Daffy yells, "Fffull-speed ahead!" and Porky pulled the switch as the babies (among them Tweety in a brief cameo) are seen going through a conveyor belt (to the tune of Raymond Scott's famous "Powerhouse") as they are diapered, fed milk and mechanically burped before they are sent by various animals, one of which is a baby hippo crying loudly and paused as it cutely said, "I'm only 3½ seconds old," before resuming its wailing. Several minor mishaps happen along the assembly line; the machine that diapers babies is presented with a baby turtle but works around it by taking the baby out of their shell, then when the milk feeding machine tries to feed the turtle, it ends up flooding the shell, forcing the turtle to bail the milk out while badmouthing the machine; when the milk feeding machine begins sprays milk over a puppy's diaper, it begins crying as an alarm suddenly sounds. In response, Porky pulls a lever that sends the puppy to be given a rather quick bath.

Problems, however, occur when Porky, reading the tags from the other babies, finds a stray egg is without an address and decides to have Daffy sit on it until it hatches. However, Daffy refuses to sit around on top of an egg. Furious, Porky chases Daffy around the factory (complete with an imitation of Porky by Daffy) until they wind up trapped on the conveyor belt. The belt winds up stuffing both of them into one package (with Porky as the legs and Daffy as the top half) and sends them off to Africa via a stork-shaped skyrocket (Patent Pending), where a gorilla is waiting for her arrival. When the gorilla looks at the "baby" she sees Daffy Duck crying, Porky peeks through the diaper, saying, "Uh, boo...", causing the gorilla to cry on the telephone, "Mr. Anthony, I have a problem!!" (a reference to John J. Anthony, who conducted a daily radio advice program at the time called The Goodwill Hour; its stock phrase was "I have a problem, Mr. Anthony").

Censorship 
When the alligator is trying to get milk from Mrs. Pig, she starts to say something before it abruptly cuts. According to Bob Clampett, she says “Don’t touch that dial” (a common cliché when radio or television shows cut to commercial). It was cut out because the Hays Office deemed it too risqué. No footage has surfaced of the original uncut scene.

Reception
Michael Barrier writes, "Baby Bottleneck, like Book Revue (1946), reveals just how great Bob Clampett's impact was on the Warner Bros. cartoons in the early 1940s... As so often in Clampett's best cartoons, there is a prevailing air of hysteria and madness: The stork is drunk, inexperienced help is delivering babies to the wrong mothers, everything is a mess — and all is bliss."

Home media
DVD: Looney Tunes Golden Collection: Volume 2
DVD: Storks (1952 blue ribbon reissue)
Blu-ray and DVD: Looney Tunes Platinum Collection: Volume 1

See also
 List of Daffy Duck cartoons

References

External links
 

1946 films
1946 short films
1946 animated films
1940s English-language films
1940s Warner Bros. animated short films
American animated short films
Looney Tunes shorts
Daffy Duck films
Porky Pig films
Tweety films
Fictional storks
Films about babies
Films directed by Bob Clampett
Films scored by Carl Stalling
Warner Bros. Cartoons animated short films